Arthur Vincent Batchelor (25 November 1902 – 5 May 1952) was an Australian rules footballer who played for Fitzroy and North Melbourne in the Victorian Football League (VFL).

Batchelor originally trained with Melbourne but after failing to impress them in training went to Fitzroy where he was picked up. One of the smallest rovers in the league at the time, Batchelor spent eight seasons with Fitzroy and won their best player award in 1929. He transferred to North Melbourne in 1932 but could only manage three games. During his career he represented the Victorian interstate side on seven occasions.

References

External links

1902 births
1952 deaths
North Melbourne Football Club players
Fitzroy Football Club players
Maffra Football Club players
Australian rules footballers from Victoria (Australia)